The 2014–15 Morgan State Bears men's basketball team represented Morgan State University during the 2014–15 NCAA Division I men's basketball season. The Bears, led by ninth year head coach Todd Bozeman, played their home games at the Talmadge L. Hill Field House and were members of the Mid-Eastern Athletic Conference. They finished the season 7–24, 5–11 in MEAC play to finish in a tie for 11th place. They lost in the first round of the MEAC tournament to Hampton.

Roster

Schedule

|-
!colspan=9 style="background:#000080; color:#FF7F00;"| Regular season

|-
!colspan=9 style="background:#000080; color:#FF7F00;"| MEAC tournament

References

Morgan State Bears men's basketball seasons
Morgan State
Morgan
Morgan